Jak İhmalyan (July 30, 1922 in Istanbul, Turkey – April, 1978 in Moscow, Soviet Union) was a painter, political activist, poet, and professor of Armenian origin.

Biography 
His father Garbis was from Konya and his mother from Kayseri. His father was also an amateur painter. Renowned Turkish painter Abidin Dino, who was in close relations with Garbis, recognizes his son as having a potential of becoming a great painter. Dino soon thereafter became a tutor to Jak Ihmalyan. In 1936, Ihmalyan graduated from a private Catholic Secondary School, then he attended a French high school, and finally graduated from a Turkish High School. In 1939 he actively participated in communist revolutionary activity by sympathizing with the TKP. However, he continued to paint in his workshop in Istanbul. In 1942 he studied at the Academy of Fine Arts Painting Department of Istanbul. After he gained his diploma, he was arrested for his political activities in 1944, after being set free, he was arrested again in 1946. He spent a total of nearly 4 years in prison. In 1948, at the end of his detention, he continued painting image building and started to write poetry. He began painting for the Armenian children's magazine "Bardez" or garden in Armenian. He also worked for the newly founded Armenian "Nor Or" newspaper. In 1949 he married Marie Abacigil and bore his first son Vartan. After gaining his passport, he went to Lebanon, where he remained there for seven years. He became an art teacher to a few art academies in Beirut. At one point, he and French painter Simon Baltax painted a billboard called "Friendship of Peoples" for the airport in Beirut.

In 1956, Ihmalyan traveled to Warsaw, Poland, he worked as a caricaturist for the Polish Communist Party. He made banners in honor of Nazim Hikmet's famous poem "Güneşi içenlerin Türküsü" or Ballad of the Sun Smokers. Ihmalyan and poet Nazim Hikmet were considered close friends.

Ihmalyan moved to Beijing, China, in 1959. He worked for the Communist radio's and studied Chinese folkloric and contemporary art scene.

In 1961, he went to the Soviet Union where he remained for the rest of his life. He worked as an editor for the first two years on the radio. He was appointed as a lecturer at Moscow State University in 1963 in the Institute of Eastern Languages of Turcology. His workshop was located in the street of Taniyevih Arbat in the lower floor of an old building. He organized various exhibitions in Moscow from 1968 to 1978. In 1974 he became a member of the Soviet Union Painters Committee. Ihmalyan died in April 1978 at the age of 56, in Moscow but had his body cremated in Yerevan.

Solo exhibitions 
2013  Sismanoglio Megaro, İstanbul

1993 Gallery MD, İstanbul

1991 Gallery Cochin Marie-Teresa, Paris

1985 Gallery İstasyon Sanat Evi, İstanbul

1982 Etchmiadzin Cathedral Museum, Vagharshapat

1980 Ankara

1980 Baku, Tbilisi, Yerevan

1979 Moscow

1979 Ankara

1978 Tartu

1973 Institute of Astronomy, Moscow

1972 House of Culture of the Institute of Asia and Africa, Moscow

1971 Vilnius

1968 Central House of Creative Workers, Moscow

References

External links 
 Jak Ihmalyan's biography

Artists from Istanbul
Armenian artists
Turkish artists
Turkish people of Armenian descent
Turkish expatriates in Lebanon
Turkish expatriates in Poland
Turkish expatriates in China
Turkish emigrants to the Soviet Union
1922 births
1978 deaths
Soviet artists